The 2017 FIA World Rallycross Championship presented by Monster Energy was the fourth season of the FIA World Rallycross Championship. The season consists of twelve rounds, started on 1 April with the Spanish round at the Circuit de Barcelona-Catalunya and concluded on 12 November at the Killarney Motor Racing Complex in Cape Town, South Africa.

Johan Kristoffersson was the season's Driver's Champion, claiming it at the Neste World RX of Latvia. The Teams' Championship was won by PSRX Volkswagen Sweden.

Calendar
On 17 October 2016 the provisional 2017 calendar was released. It once again contained twelve rounds; however the Argentine event was discontinued in favour of a new event in South Africa. Half of the rounds were supported by the RX2 category—formerly known as RX Lites.

Entries

Supercar

* Entries in grey denote one-car teams which are ineligible to score teams championship points.

RX2 International Series

 All of the RX2 cars are designed and produced by Avitas Motorsport in cooperation with Olsbergs MSE.

Championship Standings

FIA World Rallycross Championship for Drivers
(key)

a Ten championship points deducted for use of an unregistered tyre in Q3.
b Ten championship points deducted for sealing an additional turbo after scrutineering.
c Ten championship points deducted for sealing an additional turbo after scrutineering.
d Ten championship points deducted for use of a third turbocharger in the competition.
e Fifteen championship points deducted for use of a fourth engine seal.
f Five championship points deducted for receiving his third reprimand in the championship.
g Ten championship points deducted for presenting a turbocharger for sealing after initial scrutineering.
h Fifteen championship points deducted for use of a fourth engine in the championship.
i Ten championship points deducted for use of a new turbo seal after initial scrutineering.
j Fifteen championship points deducted for use of more than three engine seals in the season.
k Ten championship points deducted for use of a seventh turbocharger in the season.

FIA World Rallycross Championship for Teams

RX2 International Series
(key)

References

External links

 
World Rallycross Championship seasons
World Rallycross Championship